Leslie Erin Grossman (born October 25, 1971) is an American actress. She is known for her role as Lauren on The WB sitcom What I Like About You, and for her frequent collaborations with Ryan Murphy, appearing as Mary Cherry on The WB’s comedy-drama series Popular (1999–2001), and as various characters on the FX anthology series American Horror Story since 2017.

Early life and education
Grossman was born and raised in Los Angeles, California. She attended Crossroads School for Arts & Sciences, where she directed plays. She started acting in her senior year at Sarah Lawrence College.

Career
In 1999, Grossman was cast in her first major role, playing supporting character Mary Cherry in The WB high school drama series Popular. She had auditioned for the roles of Sam McPherson and Nicole Julian on Popular before having the part of Mary Cherry written for her. After Popular, Grossman joined the cast of The WB sitcom What I Like About You with Amanda Bynes and Jennie Garth. She had a recurring role in the first season before being added to the main cast in the second season. She played Lauren, the co-worker and best friend of Val Tyler (Garth).

On television, Grossman has appeared on Nip/Tuck, Charmed and CSI: Crime Scene Investigation, amongst other television series. In 2011 she guest starred on ABC Family's Melissa and Joey, and in 2012 she appeared on The New Normal and Ben and Kate. On film, Grossman appeared in Miss Congeniality 2: Armed and Fabulous in 2005. She appeared in two movies in 2006, Running with Scissors in an uncredited role and in Itty Bitty Titty Committee as Maude.

In 2017, she joined the cast of the seventh season of American Horror Story as Meadow Wilton and a flashback version of the infamous serial killer and Manson Family gang member, Patricia Krenwinkel. In 2018, she was promoted to series regular for its eighth season portraying witch Coco St. Pierre Vanderbilt. She later appeared in the ninth season as Camp Redwood’s owner Margaret Booth. She returned for the tenth season as a strong-willed literary agent named Ursula, and for the eleventh season as Barbara, a New York City citizen that is going through a harrowing divorce process. Her appearances on the show mark the fourth collaboration between Grossman and Ryan Murphy, having appeared on Popular, Nip/Tuck, The New Normal, and American Horror Story.

Personal life
Grossman has a daughter, Goldie. Grossman is Jewish.

Filmography

Film

Television

References

External links
 

1971 births
20th-century American actresses
21st-century American actresses
Actresses from Los Angeles
American film actresses
American television actresses
Living people
Sarah Lawrence College alumni
Jewish American actresses
21st-century American Jews